Glencar Lough, locally known as Glencar Lake, is a freshwater lake in the northwest of Ireland. Glencar Waterfall is located near the lake's north shore on the Leitrim side.

Geography

Glencar Lough lies in the Glencar Valley, between the Dartry Mountains to the north and the mountain range including Cope's Mountain to the south. The lake has two crannogs (artificial islands): one at the western end near the Drumcliff River outlet and the other at the eastern end near the Diffreen River.

Hydrology

Glencar Lough is primarily fed by Glencar Waterfall, on the lake's northern shore, and by the Diffreen River, entering at the lake's eastern end. Sruth in Aghaidh an Aird also flows out to the northern shore, just west of the Glencar Waterfall outflow. The lake drains west into the Drumcliff River, which in turn flows into Sligo Bay. Lake depth is greatest near the southern shore with a shallower shelf at the northern shore.

Natural history

Fish present in Glencar Lough include salmon and brown trout. Bird life includes tufted duck, pochard and goldeneye. These are migratory species which winter at the lake.

Ecology
The water quality was reported to be excellent  with an oligotrophic rating.  The ecology of Glencar Lough, and other Irish waterways, remain threatened by curly waterweed, zebra mussel, and freshwater clam invasive species.

History
Historically Glencar Valley was known as Glenn-Dallain and was part of the Kingdom of Breifne. The lake and its crannogs, then occupied, are mentioned in the Annals of the Four Masters, specifically the eastern crannog where "the sons of Donough O'Rourke, i.e. Donnell and Ferganainm, made an attack upon the crannog, and privately set fire to the town".

Economy
Barite was mined at Glencarbury in the Dartry Mountains above the lake between 1894 and 1979. A cable ropeway from the mine area to the lake shore was constructed in 1942. By this means the extracted barite was taken down for onward road transport.

The Glencar Water Company has its bottling plant located near the lake's northern shore. The company, established in 2008, sells water drawn from an onsite spring emanating from within the nearby Dartry Mountains.

See also
List of loughs in Ireland

References and notes

Notes

Primary sources

Secondary sources

Lakes of County Leitrim
Lakes of County Sligo